Farewell: Live from the Universal Amphitheatre, Halloween 1995 is a double live album and home video release by American new wave band Oingo Boingo, documenting their final concerts and ending on Halloween night of 1995. The band played a series of five nights, ending on Halloween night by playing more than 44 songs during a 4-hour set that went past midnight. As with all of their live shows, the setlist included songs from across the band's large discography, many of which were given new arrangements.

Several of the tracks on the CD release were culled from recordings from previous nights in the same tour, meaning the performances occasionally differ between formats. "Just Another Day" and "Nothing to Fear (But Fear Itself)" were included as bonus tracks on the double cassette release.

Farewell is also notable for its inclusion of live performances of several previously unreleased songs, namely "Burn Me Up", "Water", "Piggies" and "Clowns of Death".

Track listing

 Cassette version includes "Nothing to Fear (But Fear Itself)" as track 12.

 Cassette version includes "Just Another Day" as track 5.

Home video
A home video of Farewell was released on VHS, concurrently with the double album, in 1996. The video release featured additional performances that were not included on the CD release: a "Tender Lumplings" video introduction introduces the show; "Nothing to Fear (But Fear Itself)" is played between "I Am the Walrus" and "Piggies"; and "Just Another Day" is played between "Change" and "Stay". Conversely, the performance of "Whole Day Off" from the CD release does not appear on the video release. Additionally, the video release has "Ain't This the Life" positioned between "On the Outside" and "Wild Sex (In the Working Class)", which also differs from the CD version. A half-hour retrospective documentary was also included in the tape set, as well as the promotional music videos for "Little Girls" and "Insanity".

The 1999 compilation album Anthology contained the "Tender Lumplings" intro from the video release, as well as extra concert dialogue on "Insects", "We Close Our Eyes" and "Whole Day Off" that was omitted from the double album.

The concert video was re-released on DVD on September 18, 2001, as a two-disc set. All the bonus features from the VHS release were included on the second disc, although the two music videos were hidden Easter eggs on the DVD. Both discs also included animated menus and a hidden discography slideshow.

Personnel
Writing, performance and production credits are adapted from the album liner notes.

Oingo Boingo
Danny Elfman – vocals, guitars
Steve Bartek – lead guitar
John Avila – bass guitar, vocals
Johnny "Vatos" Hernandez – drums, percussion
Warren Fitzgerald – guitars
Sam Phipps – tenor and soprano saxophones
Leon Schneiderman – baritone and alto saxophones
Dale Turner – trumpet, trombones

Additional musicians
Marc Mann – keyboards
Doug Lacy – accordion
George McMullen – trombone
Katurah Clarke – additional percussion

Technical
Danny Elfman – producer
Steve Bartek – producer
John Avila – producer
Bill Jackson – engineer, mixing
Sylvia Massy – mixing
John Paterno – additional engineering
Doug Boehm – assistant engineer
Charlie Bouis – assistant engineer 
Van Coppock – assistant engineer 
David Nottingham – assistant engineer
Dave Collins – mastering

Jeri Heiden – art direction
N. Kellerhouse – art direction, design
Dennis Keeley – photography
Jonathon Rosen – interior Oingo Boingo logo

Notes

References

External links
 Farewell: Live From The Universal Amphitheatre at Discogs (list of audio releases)
 Farewell: Live From The Universal Amphitheatre at Discogs (list of video releases)
 Review by Tom Schulte on AllMusic

Oingo Boingo live albums
Albums produced by Danny Elfman
Albums produced by Steve Bartek
1996 live albums
A&M Records live albums
1996 video albums
Live video albums
A&M Records video albums